Carex petriei, the dwarf brown sedge, is a species of flowering plant in the family Cyperaceae, native to New Zealand. It can be used where a brown to copper-coloured ground cover is desired.

References

petriei
Ornamental plants
Endemic flora of New Zealand
Flora of the North Island
Flora of the South Island
Plants described in 1884